Aytek is a Turkish masculine given name. The name is composed  by one word and a suffix: Ay and -tek. In Turkish, "Ay" means Moon, and the suffix, "-tek" originally comes from Old Turkic suffix "-teg", which gives the meaning of "-like". The meaning of the name therefore is "like the Moon" or "Moonlike", or particularly "unique and/or bright like the Moon".

Given name
 Aytek Genc, former Australian-Turkish footballer and coach
 Aytek Aşıkoğlu, Turkish footballer who plays for Çaykur Rizespor
 Aytek Gürkan, former Turkish basketballer and administrator

References
isimarşivi 
isimler.uzmantabip.com 
Aytek isminin anlamı (Cix1.com) 
Turkish Language Association 

Given names
Masculine given names
Turkish masculine given names